Katherine Wheeler (born February 8, 1940) is an American politician who served as a member of the New Hampshire House of Representatives and later the New Hampshire Senate.

Wheeler was born and raised in St. Louis. She graduated from Smith College in 1961, and attained her master's degree from Washington University in St. Louis. She has lived in New Hampshire since 1965.

Wheeler was first elected to the New Hampshire House of Representatives in 1988. In 1996, she was elected to the New Hampshire Senate from the 21st district after Jeanne Shaheen, the seat's previous holder, was elected Governor of New Hampshire. Wheeler continued to serve in the New Hampshire Senate until her retirement in 2002.

References

Living people
1940 births
Democratic Party New Hampshire state senators
Politicians from St. Louis
Smith College alumni
Washington University in St. Louis alumni